The Living and the Dead is a trilogy of novels by Konstantin Simonov. It consists of the three novels, The Living and the Dead (Живые и мёртвые, 1959, also translated as Victims and Heroes), Nobody Is Born As Soldier (Солдатами не рождаются, 1962) and The Last Summer (Последнее лето, 1971). The first part was published in English in 1962, the rest of the trilogy is not translated. 

The trilogy is probably Simonov's greatest work. As critics noted, "the tragedy of war is depicted as a national tragedy. However, tragedy is not only social, but psychological and moral antagonism too. In that case, it is a conflict between men who share the same views ..." 

The first part was filmed as The Alive and the Dead. The second part was filmed in 1969 as Retribution.

References

1959 Russian novels
1962 novels
1971 novels
Novels set during World War II
Soviet novels
Epic novels
Literary trilogies